Margam Stones Museum is a small Victorian schoolhouse near Port Talbot, South Wales, which now provides a home for one of the most important collections of Celtic stone crosses in Britain. All originally found within the locality of Margam, and mostly assembled as a collection in the 19th century, they provide enduring testimony to a Welsh Christian culture between the 6th and 16th centuries. The striking Cross of Conbelin is the most celebrated example. From around 1000 AD, it is a huge disc cross with Celtic interlace and plaitwork patterns, figurative scenes including a hunting scene, and inscriptions telling us who made it and who erected it. There are 17 early Christian stones, plus 11 memorials and other stones from the post-Norman periods. The museum is run by Cadw, the Welsh historic sites agency, and is close to Margam Abbey Church and the ruins of  the Abbey buildings.

Access
Postcode: SA13 2TA. There is a car park for visitors to the Abbey, Museum and Abbots Kitchen Restaurant.

History of the museum
Margam Abbey was a Cistercian Abbey founded in 1147, and the nave survives as Margam Parish Church. Upon its dissolution in 1536 the Mansel family acquired it, and built a mansion in the grounds. In 1786 it passed by marriage to the Talbot family of Lacock, Wiltshire, and it is they, during the 19th century, who began to gather together various stone crosses and standing stones in the locality. Initially they were placed in the mansion grounds. In 1892 Emily Talbot gave them to the nation, in the care of the Commissioner of Public Works. In 1932 they were moved into their present building, a former Church schoolhouse close to Margam Abbey Church. Other stones from the Abbey and the local area were added to the collection, which is now in the care of Cadw.

The Stones
Of the 30 or so ancient carved stones in the museum, 17 are pre-Norman, and are displayed on the ground floor. The remainder are Margam Abbey memorials, housed in the upper gallery, and are mainly tomb slabs. They include Cistercian and post-reformation memorials.

The pre-Norman stones form a distinct local group of early Christian carvings and inscribed text, and are described as one of the most important such collections in Britain. Ten of these stones originate from Margam and its outlying settlements. Four others came from the area that became the Port Talbot steelworks, and three are from the hills and farms of the wider area.

The stones in the museum are part of a much larger group of carved and inscribed stones found across Glamorgan dating to the early Christian centuries. They can be classified into three groupings:

Latin inscribed memorials These date from 450 to 650 AD, and indicate an early Welsh Christian culture. The three stone pillars in the museum provide early text including a Welsh family tree, and a stone with both Latin and Ogham inscriptions.
Cross inscribed slabs Dating from 600 to 900 AD and crudely produced compared to the sculptured crosses, they have outline crosses cut into the stone.
Sculptured crosses and cross slabs From 900 to 1100 AD, these have detailed patterns of lattice or plaitwork, and include a number of inscriptions in Latin. They are the most visually dramatic group within the museum, and are the bulk of the pre-Norman collection.

Latin inscribed memorials

No. 1. Roman Milepost and post-Roman memorial

The milestone dates to 309–313, the dates for Emperor Maximinus. It was turned upside-down and re-used in the 6th century, when a memorial to Cantusus was inscribed.
Inscription, Side A IMPC[easar] FLA[vio]MAX MINO INVIC TO AV GVS[to]
In expanded form this translates as '(Set up in the reign of) the Emperor Caesar Flavius Valerius Maximinus, the Unconquered, Augustus'.
Inscription Side B HIC IACIT CANTVSVS PATER PAVLINVS
translates as 'Here lies Cantusus – his father was Paulinus.'
Location It was found in 1839 at the Roman Road near Port Talbot. The missing pieces (top corner and lower tip) were lost soon after discovery, but a full transcription of both sides had been made.

No. 2. Stone of Pumpeius Carantorius
This stone is also known as the Pumpeius Stone, the Kenfig Stone, and by local tradition 'Bêdh Morgan Morganwg' (The sepulchre of Prince Morgan). It was first recorded in 1578. Two areas of Ogham script appear, written as notches along the side of the stone, on the same face as the Latin name.
Date6th century
Inscription Latin: PUMPEIVS CARANTORIVS (An expansion of this gives '[The stone of] Pumpeius, [son of] Carantorius'. These are a Roman and a Latinised British name.)
Ogham (top left) transliterates as P[AM]P[E]S (taken to be a repetition of 'Pumpeius')
Ogham (right side) ROL[ACU]N M[A]Q ILL[U]NA (translated as 'Rolacun son of Illuna', two Irish names)
(Coordinates ,  It may have been nearer the ruined church until the 18th century. It was moved from its roadside location to the museum some time between 1928 and 1945.

No. 3. Bodvoc Stone
A stone pillar also known as 'The Margam Stone', and 'Carreg Lythyrenog'. It originates from a nearby mountain location, set into a prehistoric burial mound, where a replica now stands. It was first documented in 1578, and local folk-lore declared that anyone reading the inscription would die soon afterwards. On the back there is an Ordnance Survey bench mark, and various more recent carvings. It was moved to the museum before 1945.
Date Late 6th or early 7th century
InscriptionBODVOCI HIC IACIT FILIUS CATOTIGIRNI PRONEPUS ETERNALI VEDOMAVI
translates as '[The Stone] of Bodvoc. Here he lies, son of Cattegern [or Cattegirn], and great-grandson of Eternalis Vedomavus'.
decoration A small incised Maltese cross is on the top surface of the pillar. This may be of the same date as the inscription.
Location It originally stood on a cairn on Margam Mountain, between Bridgend and Maesteg. The Ordnance Survey cut a bench mark on it, and graffiti was also carved onto the stone, before it was moved to the museum, with a replica replacing it at its original location (coordinates).

Cross inscribed slabs

These date from 600 to 900 AD and are crudely produced compared to the later sculptured crosses. Several of the Margam stones feature these incised carvings, including No 3, and the back of No 13. Only No 4 falls purely within this category.

No. 4. Pillar of Thomas
A tall cylindrical stone pillar with the top broken and missing. Three outline Latin crosses are cut in, and a short inscription. It was discovered 'under a hedge' at Cwrt Uchaf Farm in 1857, before being moved to join the Margam collection.
Date 8th to early 9th century
Inscription TO ME
'Thomas' (implying 'The cross of Thomas', which could be a reference to the apostle or a local namesake.)
Location It is from Cwrt Uchaf Farm, Port Talbot (Now under the steelworks).

Sculptured crosses and cross slabs
These date from 900 to 1100 AD, and form the great majority of the Margam early Christian collection. Seven of them are from the immediate environs of Margam, and three are from the same location as the Pillar of Thomas, implying perhaps two pre-Norman monastic establishments in the area, using the local sandstone to create distinctive Celtic stone sculpture.

No. 5. Cross of Einion
The earliest of the Glamorgan disc-headed crosses (along with one at Llantwit Major). The cross and stem have intricate lattice patterns with an inscription in insular majuscule script. First mention of this cross was in 1873, by which time it was in the Abbey Chapter house collection. The circular head of the cross has been roughly cut back to make it a more even shape for re-use as building material.
Datelate 9th century
Decoration Square headed ringed cross, Geometric ribbon interlace and geometric key pattern.
Inscription CRUX XPI +ENNIAUN P[RO] ANIMA GUORGORET FECIT
'The Cross of Christ +Enniaun For the soul of Guorgorest Had this made'
LocationMargam. This provides the earliest evidence of a Christian Monastery at this site.

No. 6. Cross of Grutne
A disc-headed sculptured cross, with an inscription which fills the cross stem. First mentioned in 1697, it was in Margam Abbey Churchyard, south of the Church, until it was moved into the museum. It is made from a single piece of Pennant sandstone, although a thin tenon on its base suggests it was made to fit into a pedestal socket. Stylistically the splayed arms and wide circular armpits are similar to 10th-century crosses from the north of England.

Date: 10th century
InscriptionI[N] NOMI NE D[E]IS UM[M]I CRUX CRITDI PROP ARABIT GRUTNE PRO AN[I]MA AHEST
'In the name of God the most High This cross of Christ was erected by Grutne for the soul of Ahest'
Location Margam Churchyard

No. 7. Cross of Conbelin
The largest of the Margam Stones, and with the most decorative and figurative carvings, the RCAHMW describe it as "the most impressive of the monuments of this category in the county, if not in all Wales". It has an immense stone wheel-cross with knot-work arcs, plaitwork cross, and a central boss. The shaft includes carved figures flanking the cross, taken to be St John holding his gospel, and the virgin Mary. This is set into a massive stone pedestal block with intricate geometrical patterns and a hunting scene which would originally have formed the front, but was at some point reversed, so is now at the back of the pedestal. Both parts are made from Pennant sandstone and it has been known traditionally as 'The Sanctuary Stone'.
Date Some time between 950 and 1050 AD.
The shaft was originally longer by perhaps , probably re-socketed before the Reformation.
Inscriptions 1, within the top-left quadrant of the cross: CONBELIN P[O]SUIT HANC CRUCEM (P[RO] [A]NIMA RI[C?])
'Conbelin erected this cross for the soul of Ric...'
2, on the upper left ring margin: + SODNA + CRUCEM FECIT
Sodna made this cross.
Location It was first documented in 1690 and in 1798 it was leaning against the wall of a cottage outside Margam churchyard. By 1879 it had been moved by the Talbot family into the Chapter House ruins of the Abbey, and in 1932 was transferred to the Museum building.

No. 8. Disc-headed slab cross
The sides of this cross have been trimmed back, probably to use for building material. The cross and stem have decorative interlace panels. 
Date 10th to early 11th century
Location Margam.

No. 9. Disc-headed slab cross
This cross head has suffered considerable damage, such that less than half of the circular head of the cross remains. It has a crude interlace pattern
Date 11th
Location From Cwrt Uchaf Farm, Port Talbot (Now under the steelworks)

No.10. Cart-wheel Cross
So-called 'pannelled cart-wheel cross' with an illegible inscription.
Date 11th century
Location Stood at St Nyddid's Church (now ruined) between Margam and Kenfig.

No. 11. Cross of Ilci
Cart-wheel Cross, found along with No 12 being used as a footbridge, which has caused severe abraiding of both the carvings and the inscriptions. First noted in 1693, it is smaller but otherwise very similar to No 12, the cross of Ilquici, and shares its subsequent history.
Date late 10th or 11th century
Inscription Possible deciphering of worn inscription: ILCI [FE]CIT H[ANC] CRUCE M IN [NOM]IN E DEI SUMMI
'Ilci made this cross in the name of God most High'
Location From Cwrt Dafydd Farm, south of Margam.

No. 12. Cross of Ilquici
Cart-wheel Cross, found along with No 11 being used as a footbridge. It was first noted in 1693, was moved to the Margam Abbey Chapter house ruins during the 19th century, and moved again into the museum building in 1932.
Date late 10th or 11th century
Inscription Possible deciphering of worn inscription: PETRI ILQUICI ... A CER ... HAN C CRUCEM ...T
'The cross of St Peter Ilquici erected this cross ? for the soul of ...'
Location From Cwrt Dafydd Farm, south of Margam.

No. 13. Cart-wheel Cross
A stone slab showing a six-spoked 'cart-wheel' on the front and a linear 'ring cross' on the reverse. Although most linear crosses are dated rather earlier than the sculptured crosses, these are most likely to have been made at the same time.
Date late 10th or 11th century
Location Originally stood near Port Talbot Railway Station.

No. 14. Carreg Fedyddiol
This translates as 'The stone of Baptism' as it was wrongly thought to be a font. What was thought to be a central bowl is now identified as a pedestal with socket to hold a now absent cross. It has interlace pattern and moulded edging
Date11th century
Location It stood until 1968 at Litchard north of Bridgend.

No. 15. Crux Christi plaitwork cross slab
Part of a slab, the top of the cross, is missing. The holes through the cross arms may not originally have gone all the way through.
Date 9th or 10th century
Location Margam. (It is named after similar crosses that include a Crux Christi inscription.)

No. 16. Crux Christi plaitwork cross slab
Part of a slab, possibly made to lie flat over a grave. 
Date 9th or 10th century
Inscription Fragments of text may have included: ... FECIT CRUX CHRIST  UT....||...made the Cross of Christ for Ut...
Location From Cwrt Uchaf Farm, Port Talbot (Now under the steelworks)

No. 17. Grave Marker
Small grave marker 
Date 11th or early 12th century
Location From Llangewydd Church near Bridgend, which was demolished in the early 13th century.

Post-Norman stones

In 1147 the Margam monastery was re-founded as a Cistercian Abbey by Robert, 1st Earl of Gloucester and lord of Glamorgan. With French monks, an English lord and new Abbey buildings, there would have been little or no interest in the earlier monastery, and the early stones are the main evidence that survives. The Nave and west front of the Cistercian Abbey Church, on the other hand, survived both the reformation and a 19th-century renovation, and is now the Parish Church. The remainder of the Abbey buildings, including the Chapter house, with its memorials to the Cistercian Abbots, became part of the estate of the Mansel and then Talbot families, and are now part of Margam public park.

The Talbot family collected the early Christian Stones in and around the Chapter house, and under the care of the Commissioner of Public Works they were all re-housed in the current museum, including five grave-slabs and an effigy from the pre-reformation period, and four post-reformation memorial slabs. Following Cadws major reworking of the museum building in the 1990s these later stones are all housed in the upper gallery, creating a clear distinction between the early Christian stones and the Cistercian and later memorials.
 

Most of the grave slabs give simple initials, but three that have names are to Robert, Abbot of Rievaulx (No. 21, 1307); Henry, the 9th Abbot (No. 23, 14th century) and a partial inscription in Welsh '...EV GORWEDD GORPH ELI[ZABETH] .. HON V GLADDWYD ...' ( [here] lies the body of Elizabeth ... who was buried...', (No. 25, c. 1600).

See also
Margam Country Park
Margam Abbey
List of museums in Wales
List of Cadw properties
List of Scheduled Monuments in Neath Port Talbot

References

External links

Cadw official site
Neath Port Talbot official site
Margam Parish website with history section by John Adams

Cadw
Archaeological museums in Wales
Museums in Neath Port Talbot
History of Glamorgan
Archaeological sites in Neath Port Talbot
Margam